Dayonn Harris (born August 29, 1997) is a Canadian soccer player who plays as a winger who currently plays for the Tampa Bay Rowdies in the USL Championship.

Early life
Harris began playing soccer with Brampton East SC when he was seven years old. He later played youth soccer with Woodbridge Strikers and Vaughan Azzurri. In 2014, he began playing with Vaughan's League1 Ontario team, playing through 2019.

Career

Real Monarchs
Harris was selected by Real Salt Lake with the 20th pick in the 2020 MLS SuperDraft, before signing with their USL Championship affiliate Real Monarchs the following month. He made his league debut for the club on July 11, 2020 in a home match against the San Diego Loyal. His option was declined by Real Monarchs following the 2020 season.

Tampa Bay Rowdies
On December 31, 2020, Harris joined USL Championship side Tampa Bay Rowdies on a two-year deal. Harris made his debut for the Rowdies on May 1, 2021, during a 3-0 victory over Charlotte Independence.

Career statistics

References

External links
Dayonn Harris at Real Salt Lake Official Website
Dayonn Harris at UConn Huskies Athletics

1997 births
Living people
Association football forwards
Canadian soccer players
Penn State Nittany Lions men's soccer players
Real Monarchs players
Soccer people from Ontario
Sportspeople from Milton, Ontario
Tampa Bay Rowdies players
UConn Huskies men's soccer players
USL Championship players
League1 Ontario players
Canadian expatriate soccer players
Canadian expatriate sportspeople in the United States
Expatriate soccer players in the United States
Vaughan Azzurri players